Chalisgaon railway station serves Chalisgaon in Jalgaon district in the Indian state of Maharashtra.

Electrification
Railways in the Chalisgaon area were electrified in 1968–69.

Amenities
Amenities at Chalisgaon railway station include A computerized reservation office, waiting room, retiring room, and bookstall.

Gallery

References 

History of Electrification 
The Gazzetteers Dept Maharashtra

External links 

Departures from Chalisgaon

Railway stations in Jalgaon district
Railway junction stations in Maharashtra
Bhusawal railway division
Railway stations opened in 1863